Rull is a municipality in the southern part of the island Yap, Federated States of Micronesia.  It has a traditional dancing ground. Rull has a population of 1,847.  The historic Rull Men's Meetinghouse is located within the town.

Education
Yap Catholic High School is in Lamer village, Rull.

References

External links
Rull municipality
Location of Rull
Statistics on buildings, population; Source: Statistics Section, Office of Planning and Budget, Yap State

Municipalities of Yap